Mirjan Horvat (born 25 November 1983) was a Croatian handball player won played line player position. 

He played in the EHF Cup with RK Zamet and in the EHF Challenge Cup with RK Buzet.

External links
Eurohandball profile
Rukometstat profile

References

1983 births
Living people
Croatian male handball players
RK Zamet players
RK Crikvenica players
Handball players from Rijeka